Suleiman II may refer to:
 Suleiman II of the Ottoman Empire
 Suleiman II of Persia
 Suleiman II of Rûm
 Suleiman II of Cordoba